Muhammad Ali Pasha al-Mas'ud ibn Agha, also known as Muhammad Ali of Egypt and the Sudan (4 March 1769 – 2 August 1849), was the Ottoman Albanian governor and de facto ruler of Egypt from 1805 to 1848, considered the founder of modern Egypt. At the height of his rule, he controlled all of Egypt, The Sudans, Hejaz and the Levant.

He was a military commander in an Albanian Ottoman force sent to recover Egypt from a French occupation under Napoleon. Following Napoleon's withdrawal, Muhammad Ali rose to power through a series of political maneuvers, and in 1805 he was named Wāli (viceroy) of Egypt and gained the rank of Pasha.

As Wāli, Muhammad Ali attempted to modernize Egypt by instituting dramatic reforms in the military, economic and cultural spheres. He also initiated a violent purge of the Mamluks, consolidating his rule and permanently ending the Mamluk hold over Egypt.

Militarily, Muhammad Ali recaptured the Arabian territories for the sultan, and conquered Sudan of his own accord. His attempt at suppressing the Greek rebellion failed decisively, however, following an intervention by the European powers at Navarino. In 1831, Muhammad Ali waged war against the sultan, capturing Syria, crossing into Anatolia and directly threatening Constantinople, but the European powers forced him to retreat. After a failed Ottoman invasion of Syria in 1839, he launched another invasion of the Ottoman Empire in 1840; he defeated the Ottomans again and opened the way towards a capture of Constantinople. Faced with another European intervention, he accepted a brokered peace in 1842 and withdrew from the Levant; in return, he and his descendants were granted hereditary rule over Egypt and Sudan. The dynasty he established would rule Egypt until the revolution of 1952 when King Farouk was overthrown by the Free Officers Movement led by Mohamed Naguib and Gamal Abdel Nasser, establishing the Republic of Egypt.

Early life 

Muhammad Ali was born in the Sanjak of Kavala (modern-day Kavala), in the Rumelia Eyalet, to an Albanian family from Korça. He was the second son of a Bektashi Albanian tobacco and shipping merchant named Ibrahim Agha, who also served as an Ottoman commander of a small unit in their hometown. His mother was Zeynep, the daughter of Çorbaci Husain Agha, another Muslim Albanian notable in Kavala. When his father died at a young age, Muhammad was taken and raised by his uncle Husain Agha with his cousins. As a reward for Muhammad Ali's hard work, his uncle gave him the rank of "Bolukbashi" for the collection of taxes in the town of Kavala.  Muhammad Ali later married his cousin Amina Hanim, a wealthy widow. She was the daughter of Ali Agha and Kadriye (Zeynep's sister).

After Muhammad's promising success in collecting taxes, he earned the rank of Second Commander under his cousin Sarechesme Halil Agha in the Kavala Volunteer Contingent of Albanian mercenaries that was sent to re-occupy Egypt following General Napoleon Bonaparte's withdrawal.  In 1801, his unit was sent, as part of a much larger Ottoman force, to re-occupy Egypt following a brief French occupation that threatened the way of life in Egypt. The expedition, aboard xebecs, landed at Aboukir in the spring of 1801. One of his trusted army commanders was Miralay  Mustafa Bey, who had married Muhammad's sister Zubayda and was the ancestor of the Yakan family.

Rise to power

The French withdrawal left a power vacuum in Egypt. Mamluk power had been weakened, but not destroyed, and Ottoman forces clashed with the Mamluks for power. During this period of turmoil Muhammad Ali used his loyal Albanian troops to work with both sides, gaining power and prestige for himself. As the conflict drew on, the local populace grew weary of the power struggle. In 1801, he allied with the Egyptian leader Umar Makram and Egypt's Grand Imam of al-Azhar. During the infighting between the Ottomans and Mamluks between 1801 and 1805, Muhammad Ali carefully acted to gain the support of the general public.

In 1805, a group of prominent Egyptians led by the ulama (scholars, savants) demanded the replacement of Wāli (viceroy) Ahmad Khurshid Pasha by Muhammad Ali, and the Ottomans yielded. In 1809, though, Ali exiled Makram to Damietta. According to Abd al-Rahman al-Jabarti, Makram had discovered Muhammad Ali's intentions to seize power for himself.

Sultan Selim III could not oppose Muhammad Ali's ascension. By appearing as the champion of the people Muhammad Ali was able to forestall popular opposition until he had consolidated his power.

The Mamluks still posed the greatest threat to Muhammad Ali. They controlled Egypt for more than 600 years, and over that time they extended their rule systematically south along the Nile River to Upper Egypt. Muhammad Ali's approach was to eliminate the Mamluk leadership, then move against the rank and file. Muhammad Ali invited the Mamluk leaders to a celebration at the Cairo Citadel in honour of his son, Tusun Pasha, who was to lead a military expedition into Arabia. The event was held on 1 March 1811. When the Mamluks had gathered at the Citadel, they were surrounded and killed by Muhammad Ali's troops. After the leaders were killed, Muhammad Ali dispatched his army throughout Egypt to rout the remainder of the Mamluk forces.

Muhammad Ali transformed Egypt into a regional power which he saw as the natural successor to the decaying Ottoman Empire. He summed up his vision for Egypt as follows:

Reinventing Egypt 

Sultan Selim III (reigned 1789–1807) had recognized the need to reform and modernize the Ottoman military, along European lines, to ensure that his state could compete. Selim III, however, faced stiff local opposition from an entrenched clergy and military apparatus, especially from the Janissaries. Consequently, Selim III was deposed and ultimately killed in 1808.

Muhammad Ali shared some traits with common warlords seeking to gain the upper hand at the expense of the weakened imperial power, but scholars have noted that Muhammad Ali's rule was the first significant program of Europeanization of the military and its supporting institutions. Unlike Selim, he had dispatched his chief rivals, giving him a free hand to attempt reforms similar to those first begun by Selim III.

Muhammad Ali's goal was for Egypt to leave the Ottoman Empire and be ruled by his own hereditary dynasty. To do that, he had to reorganize Egyptian society, streamline the economy, train a professional bureaucracy, and build a modern military.

His first task was to secure a revenue stream for Egypt. To accomplish this, Muhammad Ali 'nationalized' all the iltizam lands of Egypt, thereby officially owning all the production of the land. He accomplished the state annexation of property by raising taxes on the 'tax-farmers' who had previously owned the land throughout Egypt. The new taxes were intentionally high and when the tax-farmers could not extract the demanded payments from the peasants who worked the land, Muhammad Ali confiscated their properties. The other major source of revenue Muhammad Ali created was a new tax on waqf endowments, which were previously tax-free. Through these endowments, personal income could be set aside for schools or other charitable purposes. As well as raising revenue to fund his new military, this tax took revenue away from the local elite, Mamluks and the ulama, weakening opposition to Muhammad Ali's reforms.

In practice, Muhammad Ali's land reform amounted to a monopoly on trade in Egypt. He required all producers to sell their goods to the state. The state in turn resold Egyptian goods, within Egypt and to foreign markets, and retained the surplus. The practice proved very profitable for Egypt with the cultivation of long staple cotton, a new cash crop. To help improve production, he expanded the land used for agriculture and overhauled the irrigation system, largely completed by the corvée, or forced peasant labor. The new-found profits also extended down to the individual farmers, as the average wage increased fourfold.

In addition to bolstering the agricultural sector, Muhammad Ali built an industrial base for Egypt. His motivation for doing so was primarily an effort to build a modern military. Consequently, he focused on weapons production. Factories based in Cairo produced muskets and cannons. With a shipyard he built in Alexandria, he began construction of a navy. By the end of the 1830s, Egypt's war industries had constructed nine 100-gun warships and were turning out 1,600 muskets a month.

However, the industrial innovations were not limited to weapons production. Muhammad Ali established a textile industry in an effort to compete with European industries and produce greater revenues for Egypt. While the textile industry was not successful, the entire endeavour employed tens of thousands of Egyptians. Muhammad Ali used contracts called concessions to build cheap infrastructure – dams and railroads –  whereby foreign European companies would raise capital, build projects, and collect most of the operating revenue but would provide Ali's government with a portion of that revenue. Ali also granted Barthélemy Prosper Enfantin permission to build technical schools modeled after the Ecole Polytechnique. Additionally, by hiring European managers, he was able to introduce industrial training to the Egyptian population. To staff his new industries, Muhammad Ali employed a corvée labor system. The peasantry objected to these conscriptions and many ran away from their villages to avoid being taken, sometimes fleeing as far away as Syria. A number of them maimed themselves so as to be unsuitable for combat: common ways of self-maiming were blinding an eye with rat poison and cutting off a finger of the right hand, so as to be unable to fire a rifle.

Beyond building a functioning, industrial economy, Muhammad Ali also made an effort to train a professional military and bureaucracy. He sent promising citizens to Europe to study. Again the driving impulse behind the effort was to build a European-style army. Students were sent to study European languages, primarily French, so they could in turn translate military manuals into Arabic. He then used both educated Egyptians and imported European experts to establish schools and hospitals in Egypt. European education also provided talented Egyptians with a means of social mobility.

A by-product of Muhammad Ali's training program was the establishment of a professional bureaucracy. Establishing an efficient central bureaucracy was an essential prerequisite for the success of Muhammad Ali's other reforms. In the process of destroying the Mamluks, the Wāli had to fill the governmental roles that the Mamluks had previously filled. In doing so, Muhammad Ali kept all central authority for himself. He partitioned Egypt into ten provinces responsible for collecting taxes and maintaining order. Muhammad Ali installed his sons in most key positions; however, his reforms did offer Egyptians opportunities beyond agriculture and industry.

A 2015 study found that Ali's economic policies had a positive impact on industrialization in Egypt.

Law under Muhammad Ali 
The purpose of the law was to represent Muhammad Ali in his absence. Muhammad Ali started his renovations in law by moving towards a more effective control over crime within Egypt. Most notably he did this by passing his first penal legislation in 1829, in an effort to get a stronger hold over the population. By this time, Muhammad Ali was already moving towards an establishment of an independent state, which he first expressed in 1830, by creating a state of "law and order", where Christians within Egypt can be safe, which was a way Muhammad Ali was able to pull influence from Europe. He started gradually renovating more of the government for him to hold more sway over it rather than the sultan. He implemented a police force, mostly well known within Cairo and Alexandria, that functioned not just as a form of authority over the law, but also as a form of a public prosecutor's office. Renovation of evidence used within the courts, that previously would not be used, started to be part of the system, the biggest one being autopsy reports, becoming an important asset among investigations and trials alike. With the use of non-Shari'a evidence allowed the process of law to work around the strict Shari'a rule of evidence, which restricted the use of certain forms of evidence. Autopsy became an important form of evidence used within criminal law in Egypt, even being used after Muhammad's reign amongst his successors in the 1850s.

Hakimas and the school of medicine for women 
In 1832, Muhammad Ali allowed Antoine Clot, known as "Clot Bey" in Egypt, to establish a School of Medicine for women. Clot-Bey had been invited in 1827 by Muhammad Ali to found the Qasral-‘Ayni School of Medicine at the Army hospital of Abou Zabel which later transferred to Cairo. The Army Medical School had a difficult beginning with religious officials against dissection of corpses for anatomy lessons.

The medical school for women would produce hakimas, "doctoress", to treat women and children. French women adherents of the Saint-Simonian social reform movement were living in Egypt during 1833–36 and studied or provided medical care under Clot Bey's direction. French sage-femme (midwife) Suzanne Voilquin writes of assisting during the cholera epidemic of 1834. Several of the French women contracted cholera and died.

Ali's military and economic goals required a healthy army and population from which young boys could be conscripted. Venereal diseases, especially syphilis, were common among soldiers and smallpox outbreaks led to high childhood mortality rates. Clot Bey argued that female-provided health care for women and children was crucial to maintain a healthy population. He believed that the untrained local dayas (midwives) were unable to provide appropriate care and under Egyptian law, male doctors could not treat women. Clot Bey's solution was a school to train female doctors.

The school of medicine for women followed a French model. The first two years of training provided Arabic literacy in order to communicate with patients. The following four included training in: obstetrics, pre- and post-natal care, dressing wounds, cauterization, vaccination, scarification, cupping, application of leeches, identification/preparation of common medicines. Students were provided housing, food, clothes and a monthly allowance from the state.

Graduates served at the Civil Hospital in Cairo or at health centres throughout Egypt. Some stayed at the school to serve as instructors. Marriages were arranged by the state to male doctors. Once married, hakimas were given the title of Effendi, the rank of second lieutenant, and a monthly salary of 250 piasters.

Licensed hakimas treated women and children, providing vaccinations and delivering children. They served a fundamental role in reducing the incidence of smallpox during the 19th century by vaccinating approximately 600 children a month in the Civil Hospital. They checked and treated women, mainly prostitutes, for venereal diseases. Another important task was the “forensic examination” of women. In this respect, hakimas operated in a legal setting. Their examination was used as evidence in cases involving unnatural death, suspected premarital loss of virginity, or miscarriage.

Although one task of the hakimas was overseeing childbirth, the majority of the population continued to use the dayas. Hakimas performed almost no deliveries and often were only called upon during difficult deliveries. However, dayas were required to have a certificate to perform deliveries, which could only be obtained from hakimas. They were also expected to report statistics on births to the hakimas.

A significant issue was recruitment of students. Egyptian culture at the time opposed the education of women. Therefore, the first students at the medical school were young slave girls. Slaves continued to be recruited through slave auctions as well as orphans from hospices. Despite the modest success of the school and its graduates, increasing enrolment remained a consistent problem, though the limit of 60 students was reached in 1846.

Contemporary and modern historians have viewed the creation of a school of medicine for women and the position of hakima as an example of modernization and reform for women under Muhammad Ali. Khaled Fahmy argues against this view. Fahmy states that, because the reasons for the creation of the school are primarily for the maintenance of a healthy army, the school was not a sign of reform but Ali furthering his military goals. For example, their treatment of venereal diseases was intended to curb its incidence among soldiers and smallpox vaccinations increased the pool of potential soldiers by reducing childhood mortality rate. Furthermore, the hakimas allowed for increased state control over social life. This is observed in the use of hakimas to collect statistics on childbirth, either personally or through dayas, as well as in the cases where a hakima was used to examine a woman.

Role in the Arabic literary renaissance 
In the 1820s, Muhammad Ali sent the first educational "mission" of Egyptian students to Europe. This contact resulted in literature that is considered the dawn of the Arabic literary renaissance, known as the Nahda.

To support the modernization of industry and the military, Muhammad Ali set up a number of schools in various fields where French texts were studied. Rifa'a al-Tahtawi supervised translations from French to Arabic on topics ranging from sociology and history to military technology.
In 1819/21, his government founded the first indigenous press in the Arab World, the Bulaq Press.  The Bulaq press published the official gazette of Muhammad Ali's government.

Among his personal interests was the accumulation and breeding of Arabian horses. In horses obtained as taxes and tribute, Muhammad Ali recognized the unique characteristics and careful attention to bloodlines of the horses bred by the Bedouin, particularly by the Anazeh in Syria and those bred in the Nejd. While his immediate successor had minimal interest in the horse breeding program, his grandson, who became Abbas I shared this interest and further built upon his work.

Military campaigns 

Though Muhammad Ali's chief aim was to establish a European-style military, and carve out a personal empire, he waged war initially on behalf of the Ottoman Sultan, Mahmud II, in Arabia and Greece, although he later came into open conflict with the Ottoman Empire.  He used several new strategies to ensure the success of his new military. First new recruits were isolated from the environment they were used to. They began housing soldiers in barracks, leadership enforced a strict regime of surveillance, roll call was done several times a day, and corporal punishment used to ensure the new fighting force grew to become a strong disciplined military. The army often used the bastinado and the whip to control and punish the soldiers. Muhammad not only wanted his soldiers to be disciplined, but he also created many military codes to regulate the definitions of crime and punishment, this helped to create blind obedience to the laws. A large part of Ali's goal of a European-style military was through the creation of new labelling and organizational systems to identify soldiers, distinguish officers from enlisted men, structure units, and properly distribute salaries. Soldiers were given a unique number that identified their unit and their role within it, and officers were expected to use lists with these numbers to keep a close watch on the men and ensure every man performed his clearly assigned duty. This was particularly useful in identifying deserters who often fled in the chaos of massed movement, such as during forced marches or relocation to a new encampment.
The soldiers were placed under strict surveillance in the barracks. In order to accomplish this Muhammad Ali relied on the Bedouins to guard the troops that were sent to the training camps. Despite being hired to control the troops the Bedouins were actually a menace to the government who often had to use the army to control the Bedouins. In order to combat this the government slowly switched from using Bedouins to guard the soldiers and to capture deserters and instead attempted to set up the expectation of internment from the beginning of the soldiers stay at the training camps in order to deter them from deserting the military in the first place.

Arabian campaign 

Muhammad Ali's first military campaign was an expedition into the Arabian Peninsula. The holy cities of Mecca, and Medina had been captured by the House of Saud, who had recently embraced a literalist Hanbali interpretation of Islam. Armed with their newfound religious zeal, the Saudis began conquering parts of Arabia. This culminated in the capture of the Hejaz region by 1805.

With the main Ottoman army tied up in Europe, Mahmud II turned to Muhammad Ali to recapture the Arabian territories. Muhammad Ali in turn appointed his son, Tusun, to lead a military expedition in 1811. The campaign was initially turned back in Arabia; however, a second attack was launched in 1812 that succeeded in recapturing Hejaz.

While the campaign was successful, the power of the Saudis was not broken. They continued to harass Ottoman and Egyptian forces from the central Nejd region of the Peninsula. Consequently, Muhammad Ali dispatched another of his sons, Ibrahim, at the head of another army to finally rout the Saudis. After a two-year campaign, the Saudis were crushed and most of the Saudi family was captured. The family leader, Abdullah ibn Saud, was sent to Istanbul, and executed.

Conquest of Sudan 

Muhammad Ali next turned his attention to military campaigns independent of the Porte, beginning with the Sudan which he viewed as a valuable additional resource of territory, gold, and slaves. The Sudan at the time had no real central authority, as since the 18th century many petty kingdoms and tribal sheikhdoms had seceded from the declining Sultanate of Sennar, fighting each other with Medieval weaponry. In 1820 Muhammad Ali dispatched an army of 5,000 troops commanded by his third son, Ismail, and Abidin Bey, south into Sudan with the intent of conquering the territory and subjugating it to his authority. Ali's troops made headway into Sudan in 1821, but met with fierce resistance by the Shaigiya. Ultimately, the superiority of the Egyptian troops and firearms ensured the defeat of the Shaigiya and the subsequent conquest of the Sudan. Ali now had an outpost from which he could expand to the source of the Nile in Ethiopia, and Uganda. His administration captured slaves from the Nuba Mountains, and west and south Sudan, all incorporated into a foot regiment known as the Gihadiya  (pronounced Jihadiya in non-Egyptian Arabic) which were composed of the recently defeated Shaigiya who now took service under the invaders in exchange for keeping their domains. Ali's reign in Sudan, and that of his immediate successors, is remembered in Sudan as brutal and heavy-handed, contributing to the popular independence struggle of the self-proclaimed Mahdi, Muhammad Ahmad, in 1881.

Greek rebellion 

While Muhammad Ali was expanding his authority into Africa, the Ottoman Empire was being challenged by ethnic rebellions in its European territories. The rebellion in the Greek provinces of the Ottoman Empire began in 1821. The Ottoman army proved ineffectual in its attempts to put down the revolt as ethnic violence spread as far as Constantinople. With his own army proving ineffective, Sultan Mahmud II offered Muhammad Ali the island of Crete in exchange for his support in putting down the revolt.

Muhammad Ali sent 16,000 soldiers, 100 transports, and 63 escort vessels under command of his son, Ibrahim Pasha. Britain, France, and Russia intervened to protect the Greek revolutionaries. On 20 October 1827 at the Battle of Navarino, while under the command of Muharram Bey, the Ottoman representative, the entire Egyptian navy was sunk by the European Allied fleet, under the command of Admiral Edward Codrington. If the Porte was not in the least prepared for this confrontation, Muhammad Ali was even less prepared for the loss of his highly competent, expensively assembled and maintained navy. With its fleet essentially destroyed, Egypt had no way to support its forces in Greece and was forced to withdraw. Ultimately the campaign cost Muhammad Ali his navy and yielded no tangible gains.

War against the sultan 

In compensation for his loss at Navarino, Muhammad Ali asked the Porte for the territory of Syria. The Ottomans were indifferent to the request; the Sultan himself asked blandly what would happen if Syria was given over and Muhammad Ali later deposed. But Muhammad Ali was no longer willing to tolerate Ottoman indifference. To compensate for his and Egypt's losses, the wheels for the conquest of Syria were set in motion.

Like other rulers of Egypt before him, Ali desired to control Bilad al-Sham (the Levant), both for its strategic value and for its rich natural resources; nor was this a sudden, vindictive decision on the part of Ali since he had harboured this goal since his early years as Egypt's unofficial ruler. For not only had Syria abundant natural resources, it also had a thriving international trading community with well-developed markets throughout the Levant; in addition, it would be a captive market for the goods now being produced in Egypt. Yet perhaps most of all, Syria was desirable as a buffer state between Egypt and the Ottoman Sultan.

A new fleet was built, a new army was raised and on 31 October 1831, under Ibrahim Pasha, the Egyptian invasion of Syria initiated the First Turko-Egyptian War. For the sake of appearance on the world stage, a pretext for the invasion was vital. Ultimately, the excuse for the expedition was a quarrel with Abdullah Pasha of Acre. The Wāli alleged that 6,000 fellahin had fled to Acre to escape the draft, corvée, and taxes, and he wanted them back. (See also: 1834 Arab revolt in Palestine)

The Egyptians overran most of Syria and its hinterland with ease. The strongest and only really significant resistance was put up at the port city of Acre. The Egyptian force eventually captured the city after a six-month siege, which lasted from 3 November 1831 to 27 May 1832. Unrest on the Egyptian home front increased dramatically during the course of the siege. Ali was forced to squeeze Egypt more and more in order to support his campaign and his people resented the increased burden.

After the fall of Acre, the Egyptian army marched north into Anatolia. At the Battle of Konya (21 December 1832), Ibrahim Pasha soundly defeated the Ottoman army led by the sadr azam Grand Vizier Reshid Pasha. There were now no military obstacles between Ibrahim's forces and Constantinople itself.

Through the course of the campaign, Muhammad Ali paid particular focus to the European powers. Fearing another intervention that would reverse all his gains, he proceeded slowly and cautiously. For example, Muhammad Ali continued the practice of using the sultan's name at Friday prayers in the newly captured territories and continued to circulate Ottoman coins instead of issuing new ones bearing his likeness. So long as Muhammad Ali's march did not threaten to cause the complete collapse of the Ottoman state, the powers in Europe remained as passive observers.

Despite this show, Muhammad Ali's goal was now to remove the current Ottoman Sultan Mahmud II and replace him with the sultan's son, the infant Abdülmecid. This possibility so alarmed Mahmud II that he accepted Russia's offer of military aid resulting in the Treaty of Hünkâr İskelesi. Russia's gain dismayed the British and French governments, resulting in their direct intervention. From this position, the European powers brokered a negotiated solution in May 1833 known as the Convention of Kutahya. The terms of the peace were that Ali would withdraw his forces from Anatolia and receive the territories of Crete (then known as Candia) and the Hijaz as compensation, and Ibrahim Pasha would be appointed Wāli of Syria. The peace agreement fell short, however, of granting Muhammad Ali an independent kingdom for himself, leaving him wanting.

Sensing that Muhammad Ali was not content with his gains, the sultan attempted to pre-empt further action against the Ottoman Empire by offering him hereditary rule in Egypt and Arabia if he withdrew from Syria and Crete and renounced any desire for full independence. Muhammad Ali rejected the offer, knowing that Mahmud could not force the Egyptian presence from Syria and Crete.

On 25 May 1838, Muhammad Ali informed Britain, and France that he intended to declare independence from the Ottoman Empire. This action was contrary to the desire of the European powers to maintain the status quo within the Ottoman Empire. With Muhammad Ali's intentions clear, the European powers, particularly Russia, attempted to moderate the situation and prevent conflict. Within the Empire, however, both sides were gearing for war. Ibrahim already had a sizable force in Syria. In Constantinople, the Ottoman commander, Hafiz Pasha, assured the Sultan that he could defeat the Egyptian army.

When Mahmud II ordered his forces to advance on the Syrian frontier, Ibrahim attacked and destroyed them at the Battle of Nezib (24 June 1839) near Urfa. In an echo of the Battle of Konya, Constantinople was again left vulnerable to Ali's forces. A further blow to the Ottomans was the defection of their fleet to Muhammad Ali. Mahmud II died almost immediately after the battle took place and was succeeded by sixteen-year-old Abdülmecid. At this point, Ali and Ibrahim began to argue about which course to follow; Ibrahim favoured conquering the Ottoman capital and demanding the imperial seat while Muhammad Ali was inclined simply to demand numerous concessions of territory and political autonomy for himself and his family.

At this point, the European powers again intervened (see Oriental Crisis of 1840). On 15 July 1840, the British government, which had negotiated with Austria, Prussia, and Russia to sign the Convention of London, offered Muhammad Ali hereditary rule of Egypt as part of the Ottoman Empire if he withdrew from the Syrian hinterland and the coastal regions of Mount Lebanon. Muhammad Ali hesitated, believing he had support from France. His hesitation proved costly. France eventually backed down as King Louis-Philippe did not want his country to find itself involved and isolated in a war against the other powers, especially at a time when he also had to deal with the Rhine crisis. British naval forces were ordered to sail to Syria and Alexandria. In the face of such displays of European military might, Muhammad Ali acquiesced.

After the British and Austrian navies established a naval blockade over the Nile delta coastline and the city of Acre had capitulated, Muhammad Ali agreed to the terms of the Convention on 27 November 1840. These terms included renouncing his claims over Crete, and Hijaz, downsizing his navy, and reducing his standing army to 18,000 men, provided that he and his descendants would enjoy hereditary rule over Egypt and Sudan: an unheard-of status for an Ottoman viceroy.

Final years 

After 1843, fast on the heels of the Syrian debacle, and the treaty of Balta Liman, which forced the Egyptian government to tear down its import barriers and to give up its monopolies, Muhammad Ali's mind became increasingly clouded and tended towards paranoia. Whether it was genuine senility or the effects of the silver nitrate he had been given years before to treat an attack of dysentery remains a subject of debate.

In 1844 the tax receipts were in, and Sherif Pasha, the head of the diwan al-maliyya (financial ministry), was too fearful for his life to tell Ali the news that Egyptian debt now stood at 80 million francs (£2,400,000). Tax arrears came to 14,081,500 piastres out of a total estimated tax of 75,227,500 pts. Timidly he approached Ibrahim Pasha with these facts, and together came up with a report and a plan. Anticipating his father's initial reaction, Ibrahim arranged for Muhammad Ali's favourite daughter to break the news. It did little, if any, good. The resulting rage was far beyond what had been expected, and it took six full days for a tenuous peace to take hold.

In 1846, while Ibrahim, progressively crippled by rheumatic pains and tuberculosis (he was beginning to cough up blood), was sent to Italy to take the waters, Muhammad Ali travelled to Constantinople. There he approached the Sultan, expressed his fears, and made his peace, explaining: "[My son] Ibrahim is old and sick, [my grandson] Abbas is indolent (happa), and then children will rule Egypt. How will they keep Egypt?"
After he secured hereditary rule for his family, the Wāli ruled until 1848, when senility made further governance by him impossible.

It soon came to the point where his son and heir, the mortally ailing Ibrahim, had no choice but to travel to Constantinople and request that the Sultan recognize him ruler of Egypt and Sudan even though his father was still alive. However, on the ship returning home, Ibrahim, gripped by fever and guilt, succumbed to seizures and hallucinations. He survived the journey but within six months was dead. He was succeeded by his nephew (Tosun's son) Abbas I.

By this time Muhammad Ali had become so ill and senile that he was not informed of his son's death. Lingering a few months more, Muhammad Ali died at Ras el-Tin Palace in Alexandria on 2 August 1849, and ultimately was buried in the imposing mosque he had commissioned in the Cairo Citadel.

But the immediate reaction to his death was noticeably low-profile, thanks in no small part to the contempt the new Wāli Abbas Pasha had always felt towards his grandfather.

Eyewitness British consul John Murray wrote:
... the ceremonial of the funeral was a most meagre, miserable affair; the [diplomatic] Consular was not invited to attend, and neither the shops nor the Public offices were closed – in short, a general impression prevails that Abbas Pasha has shown a culpable lack of respect for the memory of his illustrious grandfather, in allowing his obsequies to be conducted in so paltry a manner, and in neglecting to attend them in person.

...[the] attachment and veneration of all classes in Egypt for the name of Muhammad Ali are prouder obsequies than any of which it was in power of his successor to confer. The old inhabitants remember and talk of the chaos and anarchy from which he rescued this country; the younger compare his energetic rule with the capricious, vacillating government of his successor; all classes whether Turk, or Arab, not only feel, but do not hesitate to say openly that the prosperity of Egypt has died with Muhammad Ali...In truth my Lord, it cannot be denied, that Muhammad Ali, notwithstanding all his faults was a great man.

Legacy 

The prevailing historical view of Muhammad Ali is as the "Father of Modern Egypt", being the first ruler since the Ottoman conquest in 1517 to permanently divest the Porte of its power in Egypt. While failing to achieve formal independence for Egypt during his lifetime, he was successful in laying the foundation for a modern Egyptian state. In the process of building an army to defend and expand his realm, he built a central bureaucracy, an educational system that allowed social mobility, and an economic base that included an agricultural cash crop, cotton, and military-based manufacturing. His efforts established his progeny as the rulers of Egypt and Sudan for nearly 150 years and rendered Egypt a de facto independent state.

Others, however, view him not as a builder, but rather as a conqueror. He was of Albanian origin rather than Egyptian, and throughout his reign, Ottoman Turkish was the official language of his court rather than Arabic. Some argue that he exploited Egyptian manpower and resources for his own personal ends, not Egyptian national ones, with the manpower requirements that he placed on Egyptians being particularly onerous. Taken together in this light, Muhammad Ali is cast by some as another in a long line of foreign conquerors dating back to the Persian occupation in 525 B.C. This view, however, is at odds with the majority opinion of Egyptian, and other Arab historians, and Egyptian public opinion.

Much of the historical debate regarding Muhammad Ali reflects the simultaneous political struggles which occurred in Egypt during the 20th century. Fuad I of Egypt in the 1930s sponsored the collection, arrangement, and translation of the available historical documents relating to his predecessors, which became the Royal Archives of Egypt. These Royal Archives represented the primary and, in the case of some important works, the only source of information for Egyptian history until the sharia court records became available in the 1970s. Fuad's portrayal of Muhammad Ali as a nationalist and benevolent monarch therefore heavily influenced the historical debate. Later, Nasser and his revolutionary republican regime promoted an alternative narrative which portrayed Muhammad Ali as the nationalist founder of modern Egypt but also an ambitious monarch with little regard for his people whose policies ultimately benefited himself and his dynasty at the expense of Egypt.

See also 

 History of Egypt under the Muhammad Ali dynasty
 Ottoman Egypt
 Lists of rulers of Egypt
 Muhammad Ali dynasty
 Muhammad Ali's seizure of power

Notes

References

Citations

Sources 

 Ahmed, Jamal Mohammed. The Intellectual Origins of Egyptian Nationalism. New York: Oxford University Press, 1960.
 Berger, Morroe. Military Elite and Social Change: Egypt Since Napoleon. Princeton, New Jersey: Center for International Studies: Woodrow Wilson School for Public and International Affairs, 1960.
 Beška, Emanuel Muhammad Ali´s Conquest of Sudan (1820–1824). Asian and African Studies, 2019, Vol. 28, No. 1, pp. 30–56. https://www.academia.edu/39235604
 Bowring, John. Report on Egypt 1823–1838. Projectis Publishing, London. 1840 (reprint 2021) 
 Dodwell, Henry. The founder of modern Egypt: A study of Muhammad'Ali (1931) online.
 Fahmy, Khaled. 1997. All The Pasha's Men: Mehmed Ali, his army and the making of modern Egypt. New York: American University in Cairo Press. .
 Fahmy, Khaled. 1998. "The era of Muhammad 'Ali Pasha, 1805–1848" in The Cambridge History of Egypt: Modern Egypt, from 1517 to the end of the twentieth century. in M.W. Daly, ed. pp. 139–179, Vol. 2. Cambridge: Cambridge University Press.  online
 Goldschmidt, Arthur, Jr. Modern Egypt: The Formation of a Nation-State. Boulder, Colorado: Westview Press, 1988.
 Hill, Richard. Egypt in the Sudan 1820–1881. London: Oxford University Press, 1959.
 Hourani, Albert. 2002. A History of the Arab Peoples. London: Faber and Faber. 
 al-Jabarti, Abd al-Rahman. 1994.  'Abd al-Rahman al-Jabarti's History of Egypt. 4 vols. T. Philipp and M. Perlmann, translators. Stuttgart: Franz Steiner Verlag. 
 Jarvis, H. Wood. Pharaoh to Farouk. London: John Murray Limited, 1956.
 Lacouture, Jean and Simonne Lacouture. Egypt in Transition. Translated by Francis Scarfe. New York: Criterion Books, 1958.
 Marlowe, John. A History of Modern Egypt and Anglo-Egyptian Relations 1800–1953. New York: Praeger, 1954.
 Marsot, Afaf Lutfi al-Sayyid. Egypt in the Reign of Muhammad Ali. Cambridge: Cambridge University Press, 1984.
 Pollard, Lisa. Nurturing the Nation: The Family Politics of Modernizing, Colonizing, and Liberating Egypt, 1805–1923. Berkeley, California: University of California Press, 2005.
 Rivlin, Helen Anne B. The Agricultural Policy of Muhammad ‘Alī in Egypt. Cambridge, Massachusetts: Harvard University Press, 1961.
 Vatikiotis, P.J. 1991. The History of Modern Egypt: From Muhammad Ali to Mubarak. Baltimore: The Johns Hopkins University Press. . online free to borrow
 Finkel, Caroline, Osman's Dream, (Basic Books, 2005), 57; "Istanbul was only adopted as the city's official name in 1930..".

 Attribution

Further reading
 Aharoni, Reuven. The Pasha's Bedouin: tribes and state in the Egypt of Mehemet Ali, 1805–1848 (Routledge, 2014)
 
 
 Fahmy, K.Fahmy, Khaled. All the Pasha's men: Mehmed Ali, his army and the making of modern Egypt (Cambridge University Press, 1997)
 
 Kelly, J. B. "Mehemet ‘Ali's expedition to the Persian Gulf 1837–1840, part I." Middle Eastern Studies (1965) 1#4 pp: 350–381.
 Panza, Laura, and J. G. Williamson. "Did Muhammad Ali foster industrialization in early nineteenth‐century Egypt?." The Economic History Review (2014). online
 Sayyid-Marsot, A.L., 1984, Egypt in the reign of Muhammad Ali (Cambridge University Press)
 Silvera, Alain. "Edme‐Framçois Jomard and Egyptian reforms in 1839." Middle Eastern Studies (1971) 7#3 pp: 301–316.
 Stewart, Desmond. "Mohammed Ali: Pasha of Egypt" History Today (May 1958) 8#5 pp 321–327.
 Toledano, E.R.  (1985) "Mehmet Ali Paşa or Muhammad Ali Basha? A historiographic appraisal in the wake of a recent book." Middle Eastern Studies 21#4 pp: 141–159.
 Ufford, Letitia W. The Pasha: How Mehemet Ali Defied the West, 1839–1841 (McFarland, 2007)

External links 

 Al Ahram special on Muhammad Ali
 Biographic Sketch of Mohammad Ali, Pacha of Egypt, Syria, and Arabia

 
1769 births
1849 deaths
19th-century Egyptian monarchs
Ottoman governors of Egypt
Ottoman military leaders of the French Revolutionary Wars
Ottoman people of the Wahhabi War
Egyptian people of the Egyptian–Ottoman War (1831–1833)
Egyptian people of the Egyptian–Ottoman War (1839–1841)
Ali of Egypt, Muhammad
Albanian Muslims
People from Kavala
Nahda
18th-century Albanian people
19th-century Albanian people
18th-century Egyptian people
19th-century Egyptian people
Field marshals of the Ottoman Empire
Albanians from the Ottoman Empire
Burials in Egypt
Muhammad Ali dynasty
Egyptian people of Albanian descent
People of the peasants' revolt in Palestine
Rebels from the Ottoman Empire
Wahhabi War
Slave owners